The Grand National Union was a political party in Kenya.

History
The party was established by former Member of Parliament for Laikipia East Constituency, Mwangi Kiunjuri. It was formally registered on March 8, 2012. During the 2013 Kenyan general election, it fared rather poorly, winning only a number of County Assembly seats in and around Central Kenya. 

In 2016, the party merged into the Jubilee Party.

References 

Defunct political parties in Kenya
Political parties established in 2012
2012 establishments in Kenya
Political parties established in 2016
2016 disestablishments in Kenya